The 1993 Cornell Big Red football team was an American football team that represented Cornell University during the 1993 NCAA Division I-AA football season. Cornell tied for fourth in the Ivy League. 

In its fourth season under head coach Jim Hofher, the team compiled a 4–6 record and outscored opponents 213 to 158. Bill Lazor and Chris Zingo were the team captains. 

Cornell's 3–4 conference record tied for fourth in the Ivy League standings. The Big Red outscored Ivy opponents 146 to 95. 

Cornell played its home games at Schoellkopf Field in Ithaca, New York.

Schedule

References

Cornell
Cornell Big Red football seasons
Cornell Big Red football